Jose ben Jose was an early payyetan who lived in Palestine in the 4th to 5th century CE.

In some sources he is called "Jose ben Jose the orphan", on the assumption that only an orphan would receive the same name as his father; however, this assumption is not accurate in relation to all communities at the time. Alternatively, "orphan" was a title of honor, given due to his being "alone" in his skills and accomplishments. According to one tradition, he was a kohen and was given the title of Kohen Gadol.

His poetry was rich, but written in relatively simple language. His poems have been compared to those of Yanai and Kalir, but do not have rhyme schemes and do not allude to midrash, though they do have standard meter.

Most of his poetry has been lost, but some is preserved in the contemporary Ashkenazic prayer books. Although he was from an era before poets would sign their piyyutim, the Teqiatoth (piyyutim of the special blessings of Mussaf on Rosh Hashanah) of the second day Rosh Hashanah, as well as some of the Selichot of the night of Yom Kippur are attributed to him in early Ashkenazic manuscripts.

Additional reading
 Aaron Mirsky (Editor), Piyute Yose ben Yose, Mosad Biali, Jerusalem 1977 (Hebrew).

References

Jewish poets
Hebrew-language poets
6th-century poets
Jews in the Land of Israel
6th-century Jews